Syflex is a cloth simulator for use in 3D computer graphics. Syflex is available for Maya, Softimage, Houdini and LightWave 3D.

References

External links
 Homepage

Computer graphics